Richard Anthony "Rick" Sofio (March 5, 1946 – February 28, 2009) was an American politician and teacher.

Born in Bessemer, Michigan, Sofio graduated from A. D. Johnston High School in Bessemer. He went to Gogebic Community College. He received his bachelor's and master's degrees from Northern Michigan University. He also took graduated courses at Michigan State University. He taught political science and was a football coach  at A. D. Johnston High School. Sofio served on the Gogebic County Board of Commissioners and on the school board. Sofio served in the Michigan House of Representatives for two terms from 1987 to 1991. He was a Democrat. Sofio died in Lansing, Michigan.

Notes

1946 births
2009 deaths
People from Bessemer, Michigan
Northern Michigan University alumni
Michigan State University alumni
Gogebic Community College alumni
Educators from Michigan
County commissioners in Michigan
School board members in Michigan
Democratic Party members of the Michigan House of Representatives
20th-century American politicians